Forest of Fear may refer to:

 Forest of Fear (book), book in the Choose Your Own Adventure series
 Toxic Zombies, 1980 film also known as Forest of Fear